"Why Can't I Wake Up with You" is a song by English boy band Take That. Written by Gary Barlow, the song was released on 8 February 1993 as the lead single from their second album, Everything Changes (1993). The song reached number two on the UK Singles Chart and number seven in Ireland

Background and release
The original version of the song first appeared on their Take That & Party debut album; however, Gary Barlow re-wrote the song with a higher tempo and modified lyrics. This new version was released on 8 February 1993 and peaked at number two on the UK Singles Chart, spending 10 weeks on the UK Singles Chart. The song has since received a silver certification from the BPI for shipments of over 200,000 copies inside the UK.

Critical reception
Music & Media wrote, "After Sting and Clapton using a Zippo lighter, here's another brilliant rhythm pattern. Take That sings this ballad on top of the clicks and beeps of a film transported in a camera." Alan Jones from Music Week rated it four out of five, adding, "Most sophisticated yet from Take That, a strong and tuneful mid-tempo song with a light and more than competent vocal." Pop Rescue noted that it has a "great beat and synth line", adding that "the 90's beat and samples, along with the bedtime talk from a breathy Gary" makes this a hit. Mark Frith from Smash Hits gave the song three out of five, commenting that it is "transformed from a slushy LP track to a Boyz II Men-style swingbeat mid-tempo thing."

Music video
A music video was made to accompany the song. It depicts the band members on their own in different rooms of a house each singing the song, with Jason Orange dressed in just an open shirt and white briefs. At the end of the video, the band members are shown trying to get past paparazzi.

Track listings

UK CD single 
 "Why Can't I Wake Up with You?" (radio edit)
 "A Million Love Songs" (live version)
 "Satisfied" (live version)
 "Take That Medley" (live version)

UK 7-inch and cassette single 
A1. "Why Can't I Wake Up with You?" (radio edit)
B1. "Why Can't I Wake Up with You?" (live version featuring a cappella)
B2. "A Million Love Songs" (live version)

UK 7-inch EP 
A1. "Why Can't I Wake Up with You?" (radio edit)
B1. "Promises" (live version)
B2. "Clap Your Hands" (live version)

European CD single 
 "Why Can't I Wake Up with You?" (radio edit)
 "Why Can't I Wake Up with You?" (live version featuring a cappella)
 "A Million Love Songs" (extended mix)

European 7-inch single 
A. "Why Can't I Wake Up with You?" (radio edit)
B. "Why Can't I Wake Up with You?" (live version featuring a cappella)

Personnel
 Gary Barlow – lead vocals
 Howard Donald – backing vocals
 Jason Orange – backing vocals
 Mark Owen – backing vocals
 Robbie Williams – backing vocals

Charts

Weekly charts

Year-end charts

Certifications

References

Take That songs
1990s ballads
1993 songs
1993 singles
Bertelsmann Music Group singles
New jack swing songs
RCA Records singles
Songs written by Gary Barlow